Bingen is a city in Klickitat County, Washington, United States. The population was 712 at the 2010 census, a 6% increase over the 2000 census.

History
Bingen was founded by P.J. Suksdorf in 1892, and named by him for Bingen am Rhein in Germany.  Bingen was officially incorporated on April 18, 1924.

The name of the town is pronounced , despite the fact that its German namesake is pronounced .

Geography
Bingen is located at  (45.715311, -121.466790).

Climate

Bingen has a Warm-summer Mediterranean climate, abbreviated (Köppen Csb) that is characterized by hot and dry summers, and cold, chilly rainy and snowy winters. In Bingen's case the city experiences much warmer summers than locations near the coast such as Portland, but retains high winter rainfall associated with coastal locations. Daytime highs in summer are representative for areas with hot-summer-mediterranean climates, but is moderated by cool nights, causing high diurnal temperature variation.

Bingen on average has wet winters and dry summers, also representative for the region. Temperatures of above  are usual in summertimes, happening frequently.

Summer highs are extremely hot when compared to areas that are affected by coastal fog.

Demographics

2010 census
As of the census of 2010, there were 712 people, 286 households, and 161 families living in the city. The racial makeup of the city was 72.2% White, 0.3% African American, 1.3% Native American, 0.3% Asian, 0.1% Pacific Islander, 19.0% from other races, and 6.9% from two or more races. Hispanic or Latino of any race were 28.1% of the population.

There were 286 households, of which 35.3% had children under the age of 18 living with them, 37.1% were married couples living together, 11.5% had a female householder with no husband present, 7.7% had a male householder with no wife present, and 43.7% were non-families. 34.3% of all households were made up of individuals, and 5.9% had someone living alone who was 65 years of age or older. The average household size was 2.46 and the average family size was 3.15.

The median age in the city was 35.2 years. 26.3% of residents were under the age of 18; 8% were between the ages of 18 and 24; 31.9% were from 25 to 44; 24.8% were from 45 to 64; and 9% were 65 years of age or older. The gender makeup of the city was 53.8% male and 46.2% female.

2000 census
As of the census of 2000, there were 672 people, 286 households, and 157 families living in the city. The population density was 1,032.4 people per square mile (399.2/km2). There were 327 housing units at an average density of 502.4 per square mile (194.2/km2). The racial makeup of the city was 72.62% White, 0.30% African American, 3.72% Native American, 0.74% Asian, 17.56% from other races, and 5.06% from two or more races. Hispanic or Latino of any race were 25.30% of the population.

There were 286 households, out of which 34.3% had children under the age of 18 living with them, 36.4% were married couples living together, 12.9% had a female householder with no husband present, and 45.1% were non-families. 37.4% of all households were made up of individuals, and 7.7% had someone living alone who was 65 years of age or older. The average household size was 2.33 and the average family size was 3.18.

In the city, the population was spread out, with 29.5% under the age of 18, 9.7% from 18 to 24, 31.1% from 25 to 44, 21.3% from 45 to 64, and 8.5% who were 65 years of age or older. The median age was 33 years. For every 100 females, there were 102.4 males. For every 100 females age 18 and over, there were 101.7 males.

The median income for a household in the city was $24,375, and the median income for a family was $27,361. Males had a median income of $27,083 versus $19,886 for females. The per capita income for the city was $12,290. About 21.4% of families and 25.4% of the population were below the poverty line, including 33.5% of those under age 18 and 26.2% of those age 65 or over.

Transportation

Bingen is located along State Route 14, which connects it to other communities along the north bank of the Columbia River. The Hood River Bridge is located west of the city and connects State Route 14 to Hood River, Oregon, and Interstate 84. Bingen is also the terminus of State Route 141, a highway that connects it to White Salmon, Trout Lake, and the base of Mount Adams.

The city is home to Bingen–White Salmon station, which is served by daily Amtrak trains on the Empire Builder between Portland, Oregon, and Chicago. Mount Adams Transportation Service provides bus service.

References

External links

Cities in Washington (state)
Cities in Klickitat County, Washington
Columbia River Gorge
Washington (state) populated places on the Columbia River